North Jersey Valkyries was an American women’s soccer team, founded in 2009 based in Wayne, New Jersey, United States. The team was a member of the United Soccer Leagues W-League and United Women's Soccer.

The team's home field was on the grounds of DePaul Catholic High School. They played their last season in 2016 as the TSF Academy Valkyries,

Year-by-year

Stadia
DePaul Catholic High School 20102016

External links
 
  New Jersey Valkyries on USL Soccer

   

Association football clubs established in 2009
Women's soccer clubs in New Jersey
USL W-League (1995–2015) teams
Wayne, New Jersey
2009 establishments in New Jersey
2016 disestablishments in New Jersey